Zlatan Krizanović (born 17 May 1991) is a Swedish footballer who plays as a striker for Torslanda IK. He is also a coach, having spent time working with Torslanda and the Olé Football Academy in New Zealand.

Life and career

Club career 

Krizanović came through the youth system at Swedish Division 2 club Myresjö IF. By 2008 he had become a goalscorer in the first team. In December 2008, he agreed to sign for Dutch Eredivisie side AZ Alkmaar. He spent the 2009–10 season playing for the AZ under-19 side.

In 2010–11 he moved on loan to Telstar, making his debut in February 2011 in a 1–1 league draw with Almere City. He scored two goals in seven games for the season, the first coming against Dordrecht in a 2–2 draw on 18 March 2011.

In summer 2011, his contract with AZ Alkmaar expired. He left the club and returned to Sweden where he went on trial with Allsvenskan clubs Trelleborgs FF, Helsingborgs IF and Örebro SK. On 31 August 2011 he signed for Swedish Allsvenskan side Elfsborg, but on the same day he was loaned out to Falkenberg in Superettan. His first league match for Falkenbergs was a 4–0 victory against Assyriska FF on 11 September 2011.

On 3 January 2012 Falkenbergs FF confirmed that they had signed a 2-year contract with Krizanović. He left the club after the 2018 season.

International career 

Krizanović has Swedish citizenship and would also be eligible to represent Bosnia and Herzegovina and Croatia, the respective countries of his mother and father, at international level. In June 2011, he was called up to attend a training session with the Swedish U21 team.

Career statistics

References

External links

1991 births
Living people
AZ Alkmaar players
SC Telstar players
Falkenbergs FF players
Eerste Divisie players
Swedish footballers
Expatriate footballers in the Netherlands
Swedish expatriate footballers
Association football forwards
People from Myresjö